Malaparte was an American non-profit theater company based in New York City, New York.

History
While driving cross-country in 1991, actors Josh Hamilton and Ethan Hawke and playwright Jonathan Marc Sherman decided to form a theater company. Actors Robert Sean Leonard, Frank Whaley, and Steve Zahn joined the fledgling enterprise, which Hawke named after an obscure novel. Leonard later explained, "We would be sitting around New York a lot, and we bowled a lot, and eventually we thought, 'When we're not doing anything, why don't we see if we can put some new plays on?'"

Malaparte's first production was a new translation of Luigi Pirandello's 1918 play A Joke starring Hamilton, Hawke, Sherman, Cynthia Nixon, and Austin Pendleton, which ran from October 9–31, 1992. The company operated for three seasons in the 1990s as the members juggled film and television work; there were often disputes over fundraising, casting, and play selection. Shows were performed in rented venues throughout Manhattan, with a flat $10 ticket price. In 1992, Jason Blum joined Malaparte as co-producing director with Ami Armstrong who had been running the office out of her home apartment. Blum personally hawked fliers in Times Square, shouting, "Don't go see some Broadway show! Come see a new play by an American playwright!" The New Yorker critic Hilton Als wrote that the Malaparte collective "brought a new take on male anxiety to the American theatre, and was not embarrassed by its love of women, or its romanticism."

Malaparte officially dissolved in 2000, in part because the members wanted to devote more time to their children. In 2005, Hawke referred to the company's heyday as "pretty much the most thrilling period of my life".

Productions

References

Defunct organizations based in New York City
Non-profit organizations based in New York City
Culture of New York City
Arts organizations established in 1991
Arts organizations disestablished in 2000
1991 establishments in New York City
2000 disestablishments in New York (state)
Defunct Theatre companies in New York City